Šmartinske Cirkovce is a dispersed settlement in the Municipality of Velenje in northern Slovenia. It lies in the hills above the right bank of the Paka River northeast of Velenje. The area is part of the traditional region of Styria. The entire municipality is now included in the Savinja Statistical Region.

References

External links
Šmartinske Cirkovce at Geopedia

Populated places in the City Municipality of Velenje